Robert Anthony Salvatore (born January 20, 1959) is an American author best known for The Legend of Drizzt, a series of fantasy novels set in the Forgotten Realms and starring the popular character Drizzt Do'Urden.  He has also written The DemonWars Saga, a series of high fantasy novels; several other Forgotten Realms novels; and Vector Prime, the first novel in the Star Wars: The New Jedi Order series.  He has sold more than 15 million copies of his books in the United States alone and twenty-two of his titles have been New York Times best-sellers.

Early life and education

Salvatore was born in Leominster, Massachusetts, the youngest of a family of seven. A graduate of Leominster High School, Salvatore has credited his high school English teacher with being instrumental in his development as a writer. During his time at Fitchburg State College, he became interested in fantasy after reading J. R. R. Tolkien's The Lord of the Rings, given to him as a Christmas gift. He developed an interest in fantasy and other literature, promptly changing his major from computer science to journalism. He earned a Bachelor of Science Degree in Communications/Media from Fitchburg. He earned this degree in 1981 and later a Bachelor of Arts in English. Before taking up writing full-time, he worked as a bouncer. He attributes his fierce and vividly described battle scenes to his experience as a bouncer.

In the fall of 1997, his letters, manuscripts, and other professional papers were donated to the R. A. Salvatore collection at his alma mater, Fitchburg State College in Fitchburg, Massachusetts.

Career

1980s–90s
In 1982, he started writing more seriously, developing a manuscript he titled Echoes of the Fourth Magic about a submarine sucked into a post-apocalyptic future that resembled a fantasy world. He created the setting of Ynis Aielle for the novel, writing it in longhand by candlelight.  Salvatore sent the work to several publishers from 1983 to 1987, including TSR, Inc..  Mary Kirchoff, then working for TSR's book department in reviewing the slush pile of unsolicited submissions, didn't like the story that much, but did like Salvatore's writing.  TSR was then looking for an author to write the second book in the Forgotten Realms line and asked Salvatore to audition. In July 1987, Salvatore won the spot to write the book.  Much of the Realms setting was then undeveloped and waiting to be fleshed out, giving Salvatore a relatively free hand.  He wrote his first published novel The Crystal Shard in just two months, and it was published by TSR in 1988.  Salvatore's Icewind Dale trilogy (The Crystal Shard, Streams of Silver, and The Halfling's Gem) was a huge hit, with over 1.5 million copies sold of the first two novels, and the third book hitting The New York Times list of paperback bestsellers.  Salvatore's first novel published in hardcover was another Drizzt book, The Legacy (1992).  The Legacy placed in the number 9 slot of The New York Times list of bestsellers in September 1992.  In 1994, Salvatore branched out beyond working for TSR, and signed a three-book deal with Warner Books for what would become The Crimson Shadow series.  Salvatore and TSR engaged in a dispute afterward.  TSR's managing editor of the fiction department, Brian Thomsen, wanted Salvatore to write six additional novels when renewing the contract, rather than the three novels that Salvatore offered.  Salvatore, who had just agreed to write 3 novels for Warner and had written 14 novels in the prior 6 years, was unwilling to overcommit himself to write so many novels in such a short span of time at the rate TSR offered; he would have to write three novels a year to honor all his obligations to TSR and Warner had he taken TSR's contract as written.  Thomsen suggested that Salvatore find a ghostwriter, a suggestion that Salvatore found distasteful.  Negotiations ultimately fell through; TSR was unwilling to budge on their demands, and was unwilling to put the Drizzt brand on hold while Salvatore finished books for other publishers.  They also possibly believed that the "brand" was more valuable than any one specific author, as Thomsen said he would find another author to write Drizzt (as TSR owned the rights to the Forgotten Realms and all its characters).  Salvatore, for his part, felt bullied by the company whom he had contributed such a valuable property, and signed a three-novel deal with Del Rey instead for what would become The DemonWars Saga.  Salvatore's last Drizzt novel for some time was Passage to Dawn in 1996, finishing up his previous contract.  Salvatore publicly stated that if TSR assigned another author to write Drizzt, he'd never write Drizzt again, and would assume that Drizzt died.  The management at TSR followed through their threat and chose a new author to write stories about Drizzt; Mark Anthony completed the Drizzt novel The Shores of Dusk.  However, Wizards of the Coast acquired TSR in 1997, and one of their first actions was to fire Thomsen and attempt to mend broken bonds with TSR's authors.  Wizards decided to shelve Anthony's novel and not publish it, and to lure Salvatore back.  The result was Salvatore returning to the Drizzt series with The Silent Blade (1998). The Silent Blade won the Origins Award that year.  Salvatore went on to publish several more series of books in the Forgotten Realms campaign world.

Salvatore wrote Vector Prime, which was published in 1999 as the first novel in the Star Wars: The New Jedi Order series. Vector Prime was controversial among Star Wars fans because its plot included the death of Chewbacca the Wookiee, who became the first major character from the original trilogy to be permanently killed off in the Star Wars expanded universe novels.   Many fans thought that Salvatore himself had made this decision; however, the decision to kill Chewbecca did not come from Salvatore.  Lucasfilm and the editors at Del Rey had decided they needed to kill a character to sell the new threat of the Yuuzhan Vong; the editors wanted to kill Luke Skywalker, but were refused permission by Lucasfilm.  Randy Stradley, then an editor at Dark Horse Comics, suggested killing Chewbacca, and the decision came down that he would die in the novel.  Much later, after Disney bought the rights to Star Wars in 2012, Disney declared in 2014 that all Expanded Universe works released before 2014 were non-canon.  The death of Chewbacca in Vector Prime was cited as a major reason why they revoked the canonical status of so many works.

2000s–present
In February 2008, Devil's Due Publishing published Spooks, a comic book about a U.S. government anti-paranormal investigator/task force created by Larry Hama and Salvatore. Hama created the military characters and plots, and Salvatore covered the monster characters.

In addition to his novels, Salvatore has written for video games.  He wrote the story for the PlayStation 2, Xbox and PC video game Forgotten Realms: Demon Stone (2004), working with the design team at Stormfront Studios. The game was published by Atari and was nominated for awards by the Academy of Interactive Arts & Sciences and BAFTA. CDS books commissioned him to edit a four book series based on the interactive online EverQuest game. He also wrote the bot chat lines for the Quake III bots.

Salvatore was hired as creative director for the newly created game developer 38 Studios, owned by former baseball player Curt Schilling. He wrote the dialogue and created a backstory spanning ten thousand years for the fantasy game Kingdoms of Amalur: Reckoning, which was released in February 2012, and sold over one million units.  However, three months later 38 Studios declared bankruptcy and ceased operations. The company laid off its entire staff, including Salvatore, with the $2 million fee for his services having never been paid. Salvatore claimed he harbored no ill will toward Schilling in a 2014 interview with The Escapist. "Why would I sue Curt [for the $2 million]? Maybe he made a couple of bad business decisions ... [but] he didn't do anything nefarious, and he got wiped out. He's lying in the gutter and you want me to kick him in the head? Why would anyone do that?"

In 2010, Wizards of the Coast announced a new deal with Salvatore to write six more books featuring Drizzt the dark elf; the books were released between 2011 and 2016.

Bibliography

Salvatore's most famous and popular character is Drizzt Do'Urden, a drow, or dark elf, portrayed against the stereotypes of his race, who defies a nation of evil enemies with his swordsmanship and courage. He abandons the Underdark, a barren land of unmarked and limitless tunnels where deadly creatures continually lurk. His journey for freedom leads him to the surface where he faces discrimination at every turn because of his dark heritage. Drizzt stumbles along in a harsh world until he finally comes upon friends who understand the kindness of his heart. Together, they fight for justice against sinister enemies who dare to disrupt the peace of Drizzt's newfound homeland.

References

External links

 
 R. A. Salvatore at Fantastic Fiction
 
 
 

1959 births
20th-century American male writers
20th-century American novelists
21st-century American male writers
21st-century American novelists
American fantasy writers
American male novelists
American science fiction writers
American writers of Italian descent
Fitchburg State University alumni
Living people
Novelists from Massachusetts
People from Leominster, Massachusetts